Nebbi General Hospital, also Nebbi Hospital, is a hospital in the Northern Region of Uganda.

Location

The coordinates of the hospital are:02°28'39.0"N, 31°05'08.0"E (Latitude:2.477495; Longitude:31.085549).

Overview
Nebbi Hospital was established in 1969 by the first government of Prime Minister Milton Obote. It has a bed capacity of 108. As with many government hospitals built at the same time, the hospital infrastructure was in dilapidated state, with antiquated equipment.

Recent developments
In 2013, the government of Uganda solicited bids for the renovation of certain hospitals, including Nebbi General Hospital, using funds borrowed from the World Bank. The work was contracted to China Railway Number 5 Engineering Group, at a contract cost of US$3.8 million. Work started in February 2014 with an initial completion date of June 2015. Due to multiple delays, the work was completed in May 2016. The work included the following components:
1. Construct a new, larger outpatient department 2. Construct a new larger casualty department (emergency room) 3. Construct a building to house the diesel generator for electricity 4. Build a placenta disposal facility 5. Build a disposal facility for bio-medical waste 6. Build a laundry facility for patients' family members 7. Build a kitchen and dining room or the patients' family members 8. Build ventilated improved pit latrines for patient's families and outpatients 9. Refurbish the T-Block building and 10. Refurbish two existing staff houses.

See also
List of hospitals in Uganda

References

External links
  Website of Uganda Ministry of Health
 Website of Nebbi District Local Government

Hospitals in Uganda
Nebbi District
West Nile sub-region
Northern Region, Uganda
1969 establishments in Uganda
Hospital buildings completed in 1969